Rivadeneyra Shoal is a shoal or seamount in the Eastern Pacific Ocean between Malpelo Island and Cocos Island. It was reported in October 1842 at the position  with a depth of 10 feet.

Sources
 Findlay, Alexander George (1851). A Directory for the Navigation of the Pacific Ocean. London: Laurie, p 1054.
 Great Britain Hydrographic Office (1860). South America Pilot: Including Magellan Strait, the Falkland and Galapagos Islands. Eyre and Spottiswoode, p 394.
 Stommel, Henry (1984). Lost Islands: The Story of Islands That Have Vanished from Nautical Charts. Vancouver: University of British Columbia Press, p 113. .

Phantom islands
Reefs of the Pacific Ocean
Seamounts of the Pacific Ocean
1842 establishments